Aghaboy is a townland in County Antrim, Northern Ireland. It is situated in the historic barony of Toome Upper and the civil parish of Drummaul and covers an area of 286 acres

The name derives from the Irish: Achadh Bui (yellow field).

The population of the townland decreased during the 19th century:

The decrease in population between 1881 and 1891 was attributed to emigration and removals.

See also 
List of townlands in County Antrim

References

Townlands of County Antrim
Civil Parish of Drummaul